is a Japanese manga series written and illustrated by Motoei Shinzawa. A first series Third Year Funny-face Club was serialized in Shueisha's Weekly Shōnen Jump from October 1980 to April 1982. High School! Kimengumi was serialized in the same magazine from April 1982 to July 1987. An anime television series aired from October 1985 to September 1987 and an animated film premiered in July 1986. A sequel manga, titled Flash! Funny-face Club, was published in Square Enix's Monthly Shōnen Gangan from 2001 to 2005.

Summary

High School! Kimengumi is an episodic chronicle of the bizarre adventures of a group of misfit junior high school (and later high school) boys who form a club known as the "Kimengumi". All of the character names in the series are puns. For example, "Kawa Yui" is another way of saying "kawaii", and "Uru Chie" is a slang form of "urusai", meaning "obnoxious" or "annoying".

Media

Manga
High School! Kimengumi is written and illustrated by Motoei Shinzawa. A first series titled  was published in Shueisha's Weekly Shōnen Jump from October 13, 1980, to April 12, 1982. Shueisha collected its chapters in six tankōbon volumes published between August 15, 1981, and January 8, 1983.

High School! Kimengumi was serialized in Weekly Shōnen Jump from April 19, 1982, to July 6, 1987. Shueisha released the individual chapters into twenty volumes published between April 8, 1983, and February 10, 1988.

Another series titled  was published by Popeye on December 1, 2000. Shueisha later released the series into a single volume on February 4, 2004.

A fourth series, titled , was serialized in Square Enix's Monthly Shōnen Gangan from 2001 to 2005. It was compiled into three tankōbon volumes published from July 22, 2002, and July 22, 2005.

Volume list

Third Year Funny-face Club

|}

High School! Funny-face Club

|}

Flash! Funny-face Club

|}

Anime

A 86-episode anime adaptation produced by NAS and Fuji Television was broadcast in Japan from October 12, 1985, to September 21, 1987, on Fuji TV.

Songs
The theme songs, with the exceptions of the fifth ending and insert Nakuko mo Warau Kimengumi, were performed by various sub-groups or former members of Onyanko Club:
Opening themes 1–5, ending themes 1, 3–4, 6, insert songs 1–2 by Ushiroyubi Sasaregumi
Opening themes 6–7, ending themes 7–8 by Ushirogami Hikaretai
Ending theme 2 by Onyanko Club and Ushiroyubi Sasaregumi
Ending theme 5 by Musukko Club

Opening themes
Ushiroyubi Sasare-gumi
Zō-san no Scanty
Nagisa no "..." (Kagi Kakko)
Waza Ari!
Kashiko
Toki no Kawa wo Koete
Anata wo Shiritai

Insert songs
Abunai Sa·ka·na
Watashi ha Chie no Wa (Puzzling)
Nakuko mo Warau Kimengumi

Closing themes
Jogakusei no Ketsui
Banana no Namida
Neko Jita Gokoro mo Koi no Uchi
Not Only ★ But Also
Chotto Karai Aitsu
Pythagoras wo Buttobase
Ushirogami Hikaretai
Tatsutori Ato wo Nigosazu

Video releases
Kimengumi has been released on DVD in Japan in two different box set releases. The movie was released as part of the second DVD set in 2008.

High School! Kimengumi DVD Box 1
Pioneer LDC, 2001-05-25
High School! Kimengumi DVD Box 2
Pioneer LDC, 2001-07-25
High School! Kimengumi DVD Box 3
Pioneer LDCA, 2001-09-21

High School! Kimengumi Complete DVD Box 1
E-Net Frontier, 2007-12-21
High School! Kimengumi Complete DVD Box 2
E-Net Frontier, 2008-02-22

Video games

There is a traditional boardgame based on the series titled High School! Kimengumi Game, released by Bandai. Three video games have been based on the series:
High School! Kimengumi for the MSX2, an adventure game
High School! Kimengumi for the Sega Master System, a port of the MSX 2 game
High School! Kimengumi: The Table Hockey for PlayStation

There is also a series of pachinko games based on the series manufactured by Maruhon

Reception
In a 2006 survey of celebrities by TV Asahi, High School! Kimengumi was listed as #87 on a list of the top 100 favorite anime series.

References

External links
 High School! Kimengumi official anime website at Fuji TV 
 
 

 
1980 manga
1982 manga
1985 anime television series debuts
1986 anime films
2000 manga
2001 manga
Fuji TV original programming
Gallop (studio)
Gangan Comics manga
Japanese high school television series
Onyanko Club
School life in anime and manga
Shōnen manga
Shueisha franchises
Shueisha manga
Shunsuke Kikuchi